The Baracu is a right tributary of the river Neajlov in Romania. It flows into the Neajlov in Vânătorii Mici.

References

Rivers of Romania
Rivers of Dâmbovița County
Rivers of Giurgiu County